Downey to Lubbock is a collaborative studio album by American country musicians Dave Alvin and Jimmie Dale Gilmore. It was released on June 1, 2018, by Yep Roc Records.

Critical reception
Downey to Lubbock was met with "universal acclaim" reviews from critics. At Metacritic, which assigns a weighted average rating out of 100 to reviews from mainstream publications, this release received an average score of 81 based on 7 reviews.

Track listing

Charts

References

2018 albums
Collaborative albums
Dave Alvin albums
Jimmie Dale Gilmore albums
Yep Roc Records albums